Charmaine Shamiso Mapimbiro (born 13 July 1994), professionally known as Sha Sha, is a Zimbabwean singer from Mutare. Hailed by many as "the queen of amapiano",  her career began in 2011, at the age of 19 and later was discovered by Audius Mtawarira. She gained popularity for her collaborations with South African amapiano producers such as DJ Maphorisa and Kabza de Small.

Having signed a record deal with Blaq Boy Music, her debut Blossom EP, was released in 2019. She was awarded Best New International Act at the 2020 BET Awards.

Early life and career

1994–2017: Early years and career beginnings 
Born in Mutare, Mapimbiro moved around Zimbabwe whilst growing up following her parents' separation, often residing with her grandmother or aunts. Her music journey began after joining the choir, subsequently taking vocal and piano lessons as a child.

Whilst a teenager, one of Mapimbiro's friends helped get one of Zimbabwe's biggest radio stations to play her music. This radio airplay was well-received and caught the attention of singer-songwriter Audius Mtawarira, who eventually became her mentor and helped her with improving her craft. With help from Zimbabwean musician Brian Soko in 2017, the duo were connected with South African musicians such Rouge and Priddy Ugly who featured her on their releases. During this time, Sha Sha also crossed paths with DJ Maphorisa through her cab driver. The two began working on ballads together and, with help from the latter, was able to meet future collaborators Mlindo the Vocalist and Don Laka.

2018–2020: Blossom EP 
Sha Sha was signed to DJ Maphorisa's label Blaqboy Music in 2018. After gaining prominence with her vocals on the songs "Akulaleki" by Samthing Soweto, "Nge Thanda Wena" by Mlindo The Vocalist and "We Mama" by Scorpion Kings, Sha Sha released her debut EP, Blossom on November 1, 2019.

On December 3, 2020, Sha Sha released the single "Woza".

2021-present: I'm Alive
Towards the end of the June 2022, she signed a management deal with Black Major.

"Ungowami" featuring DJ Soa Mattrix was released on July 7, 2022 as album's lead single off her debut studio album I'm Alive which was set to be released on 26 August. 

The album was released on September 23, 2022 in South Africa.

Discography

Studio albums 
 I'm Alive (2022)

Extended plays 
 Blossom (2019)

Awards and nominations

References

External links 
 

Living people
1994 births
21st-century Zimbabwean women singers
People from Mutare
Deep house musicians
Amapiano musicians